The following is a list of Japanese manga magazines by circulation, during the timespan of April 1 to June 30, 2022. These figures have been collected by the Japanese Magazine Publishers Association, which updates every three months. The updates are given long after the months they reflect have passed due to the amount of information it takes to compile.

Periodical circulation

Total circulation

See also
List of magazines by circulation
List of manga magazines
List of manga magazines published outside of Japan
List of best-selling manga
List of best-selling comic series

Notes

Explanatory notes

General circulation

References

 
Japanese manga magazines by circulation
Manga magazines by circulation
Japanese manga magazines by circulation
Japanese manga by circulation